The Accursed Kings is a series of historical novels by French author Maurice Druon about the French monarchy in the 14th century. Published between 1955 and 1977, the series has been adapted as a miniseries twice for television in France.

American author George R. R. Martin called The Accursed Kings "the original game of thrones", citing Druon's novels as an inspiration for his own series A Song of Ice and Fire.

Plot
Set in the 14th century during the reigns of the last five kings of the direct Capetian dynasty and the first two kings of the House of Valois, the series begins as the French King Philip the Fair, already surrounded by scandal and intrigue, brings a curse upon his family when he persecutes the Knights Templar. The succession of monarchs that follows leads France and England to the Hundred Years' War.

Characters

Novels

The first six novels of Les Rois maudits were published in France by Del Duca between 1955 and 1960, and the final volume was released by Plon in 1977. The initial six books were first issued in English (translated by Humphrey Hare) between 1956 and 1961, by Rupert Hart-Davis in the United Kingdom and by Scribner's in the United States, with periodic reprints through the 1980s. Between 2013 and 2015, HarperCollins reissued the entire  series in print and audiobook, including the last instalment The King Without a Kingdom, which had never previously been published in English.

Le Roi de fer (1955)
(English title: The Iron King)
French King Philip the Fair rules with an iron fist, but is surrounded by scandal and intrigue. Philip's daughter Isabella, Queen of England, plots with the ambitious Robert of Artois to catch the wives of her three brothers—Marguerite, Jeanne and Blanche—in their suspected adulterous affairs. Robert's own motive is to avenge himself on Jeanne and Blanche's mother, his great aunt Mahaut, Countess of Artois, who he believes has stolen his rightful inheritance. Philip's younger brother Charles, Count of Valois, resents the power and influence of the common-born Guillaume de Nogaret, Philip's prime councillor and keeper of the seal, and Enguerrand de Marigny, Philip's Chamberlain. When Philip's self-serving persecution of the Knights Templar ends with the Templar Grand Master Jacques de Molay being burned at the stake, Molay curses his accusers—Pope Clement V, Nogaret and Philip himself—to the 13th generation. Marguerite and Blanche are sentenced to life imprisonment for their crimes, and their lovers Gautier and Philippe d'Aunay are tortured and executed. Jeanne, innocent of adultery herself but complicit in the scandal, is imprisoned indefinitely. Forty days after Molay's execution, Clement dies of fever; shortly thereafter, Mahaut's lady-in-waiting Béatrice d'Hirson arranges for Nogaret's painful death by means of a poisoned candle. Philip fears that Molay's curse is to blame; soon enough, he suffers a cerebral hemorrhage and collapses during a hunt, and dies days later.

La Reine étranglée (1955)
(English title: The Strangled Queen)
Philip's eldest son has been crowned Louis X, but his adulterous wife Marguerite remains imprisoned at the Château Gaillard. Seeking to remarry and father a male heir, Louis sends Robert of Artois to compel Marguerite to sign a statement, in exchange for her freedom, that her marriage to Louis was never consummated and that her daughter Jeanne is illegitimate. She refuses, and Louis' plan to secure an annulment and marry the beautiful Clemence of Hungary is further stalled by the papal conclave's failure to elect a new pope. Marigny finds that his enemies—led by Charles, Count of Valois—are systematically excluding him from the new king's inner circle. Louis' brother, Philippe, Count de Poitiers, and Valois both try to assert some influence over the indecisive king, Philippe for the good of the kingdom and Valois for personal gain. Desperate for freedom, Marguerite reconsiders, but her "confession" never reaches Robert. When he returns to her prison, Marguerite is ill from her confinement—and on Valois' orders, Robert's man Lormet strangles her to death. Though his initial efforts to destroy Marigny fail, Valois manages—with the help of the Lombard banker Tolomei—to assemble a barrage of criminal charges that sees Marigny executed.

Les Poisons de la couronne (1956)
(English title: The Poisoned Crown; literally "The Poisons of the Crown")
Louis, now a widower, marries the beautiful Clemence of Hungary. Her discovery of his illegitimate daughter prompts Louis to confess all of his sins to her, and he swears to do whatever penance she requires. Mahaut and Béatrice use magic to assure that Philippe takes back his wife, Mahaut's daughter Jeanne, from her imprisonment. Louis' uncle Charles, Count of Valois, continues grasping for influence over royal affairs by trying to secure the allegiance of the new queen, his niece by his previous marriage. Tolomei's nephew, the young banker Guccio Baglioni, marries noblewoman Marie de Cressay in secret. With encouragement from Robert of Artois, Mahaut's vassal barons revolt against her. Louis is compelled to intervene, and strips her of power when she refuses to submit to his arbitration. Mahaut poisons Louis with Béatrice's help, and he dies, leaving behind a pregnant Clemence and the court in turmoil.

La Loi des mâles (1957)
(English title: The Royal Succession; literally "The Law of Males")
With Louis dead and Clemence pregnant, Louis' uncle Charles and brother Philippe plot against each other for the regency. Waiting in the wings is Marguerite's brother Eudes of Burgundy, who seeks to defend the rights of Louis and Marguerite's daughter Jeanne. Philippe outmaneuvers his rivals and assumes power. Having trapped the embattled cardinals together in Lyon, he forces a papal conclave that—with some subterfuge—elects Jacques Duèze as Pope Jean XXII. Marie de Cressay gives birth to Guccio's son in a convent, and within days Clemence gives birth to Louis' son Jean. With Clemence deathly ill, Hugues de Bouville and his clever wife Marguerite enlist Marie as wet nurse to the young king. The Countess Mahaut recognizes the infant Jean as the only obstacle between Philippe—who is married to her daughter Jeanne—and the French throne. Fearful of Mahaut, Hugues and Marguerite switch Jean with Marie's child Giannino when the baby king is presented to the barons by the countess. Poisoned by Mahaut, the infant dies almost immediately. Without direct proof of her guilt, and unsure of Philippe's involvement, the Bouvilles are compelled to keep their secret or possibly be implicated themselves. As Philippe secures his support and accedes the throne, the Bouvilles coerce a devastated Marie to raise Jean as her own and—as a means to keep the secret—never see Guccio again.

La Louve de France (1959)
(English title: The She-Wolf of France)
Louis and Philippe's younger brother Charles IV is now the French king. His sister Isabella is still married to the English King Edward II, whose open favour of his lover Hugh Despenser and the extended Despenser family has marginalized Isabella and incited rebellion among Edward's vassal barons. When rebel Baron Roger Mortimer escapes imprisonment in the Tower of London and flees to France to plot against Edward, Isabella later follows on the pretext of negotiating a treaty with her brother, and joins Mortimer as his lover and co-conspirator. A guilt-ridden Bouville finally admits the truth about the French boy king to Pope Jean, whose link to Philippe encourages him to keep the secret. Mahaut seeks her revenge against Isabella—now popularly called the "She-Wolf of France"—by plotting her expulsion from France and certain death at Edward's hands. However, aided by forces from Holland and Edward's own dissenting barons, Mortimer and Isabella invade England and depose Edward in favor of his and Isabella's son Edward III. The daughter and wife of kings, Isabella does not want to give the order to have the elder Edward killed, but a jealous and petulant Mortimer forces her hand, and his minions brutally murder the imprisoned and humiliated former king, following Hugh Despenser's trial and most cruel execution.

Le Lis et le lion (1960)
(English title: The Lily and the Lion)
Charles dies and is succeeded by his cousin Philippe of Valois, thanks in no small part to the machinations of Robert of Artois. Meanwhile, young Edward III has married Philippa of Hainaut, and the popularity of his regent Mortimer is waning. When Mortimer orchestrates the execution of Edward's uncle Edmund, Earl of Kent, Edward reclaims the throne and has Mortimer executed. With Philippe in his debt, Robert reopens his claim on Artois, but is forced to forge documents that Mahaut has destroyed. In love with Robert and excited by danger, Béatrice poisons Mahaut, and then her daughter Jeanne, to aid Robert's cause. When his case unravels, Robert refuses Philippe's offer of a quiet defeat, and is subsequently implicated in a lifetime of crimes. Now a fugitive and outlaw, Robert spends years wandering Europe before he seeks out Edward. Convincing the English king to make his claim on the French throne with force, Robert is killed in battle just as campaign is picking up speed. Twelve years later, Giannino Baglioni is summoned to Rome by the self-declared tribune Cola de Rienzi, who reveals to the Sienese banker that Giannino is actually Jean I, the rightful King of France. Rienzi's murder, however, thwarts Jean's bid for the throne, and he eventually dies in captivity in Naples, the last direct victim of the curse inflicted upon Philippe's house. The epilogue to the novel suggests, however, that the curse would reverberate over the House of Valois and France itself until the burning of Joan of Arc in Rouen a century after the main events of the novel.

Quand un Roi perd la France (1977)
(English title: The King Without a Kingdom; literally "When A King Loses France")
Cardinal Talleyrand-Périgord recounts the troubled reign of Philippe's son, Jean II "The Good", who continues the reversal of fortune for France set in motion by his father. Jean creates discord among his lords by the disproportionate favour he bestows upon the handsome Charles de La Cerda, whose subsequent murder ignites a bitter feud between Jean and his treacherous son-in-law, Charles, King of Navarre. Encouraged by the Navarese and taking advantage of the turmoil in France, Edward III renews his claim to the French throne. His son, Edward, the Black Prince, mounts a relatively small but largely unchecked invasion of France. Finally confronted by Jean's forces, which vastly outnumber his, young Edward still manages to turn the tables and defeat the French, capturing Jean, his youngest son Philippe and many of his great lords.

Television adaptations

Les Rois maudits has been adapted twice for French television.

1972 miniseries
The 1972 TV adaptation of Les Rois maudits was broadcast by the ORTF from 21 December 1972 to 24 January 1973, and starred Jean Piat as Robert d'Artois and Hélène Duc as Mahaut d'Artois. Adapted by Marcel Jullian and directed by Claude Barma, its six episodes were directly based on—and named after—the first six novels in Druon's series. Dubbed "the French I, Claudius", the series was "hugely successful", and brought the novels "from cult to mainstream success". The production was shot in studio, with minimal sets. Bertrand Guyard of Le Figaro praised the production and cast in 2013. The series was broadcast in the United Kingdom by the BBC in French with English subtitles in June–July 1974 and again in August–September 1975.

2005 miniseries
In 2005, Les Rois maudits was again adapted in a joint French-Italian production directed by Josée Dayan, starring Philippe Torreton as Robert and Jeanne Moreau as Mahaut. Broadcast on France 2 from 7 November to 28 November 2005, its five episodes are named after novels 1–3 and 5–6 (the exception being La Loi des mâles). The series premiered with 8.6 million viewers, and the finale garnered over 6.2 million viewers. Overall Les Rois maudits averaged 7.2 million viewers, an audience share of 27.9%.

The miniseries was nominated for a 2006 Globes de Cristal Award for Best Television Film or Television Series.

Reception
According to John Lichfield, The Independent French correspondent and a friend of Druon's, "Les Rois maudits was written to make money very quickly ... [Druon] himself was not very proud of it." However the series was "popular and critically praised", and numbered among Druon's best known works. Lichfield noted:

In his youth, Druon had cowritten the lyrics to Chant des Partisans (1943), a popular French Resistance anthem of World War II. In 1948 he received the Prix Goncourt for his novel . Though Ben Milne of the BBC noted in 2014 that Druon is "barely known in the English-speaking world", American author George R. R. Martin called the author "France's best historical novelist since Alexandre Dumas, père". Martin dubbed The Accursed Kings "the original game of thrones", citing Druon's novels as an inspiration for his own series A Song of Ice and Fire, which has been adapted for television as Game of Thrones and House of the Dragon. Martin's UK publisher HarperCollins began reissuing the long out of print Accursed Kings series in 2013, with Martin himself writing an introduction. He wrote:

Writing for The Wall Street Journal, Allan Massie praised Druon's "thorough research, depth of understanding and popular touch", noting that "Druon’s re-creation of medieval Paris is so vivid that it loses nothing in comparison with the evocation of the city in the greatest of French medievalist novels, Victor Hugo’s Notre-Dame de Paris". Massie added:

In 2013, Stefan Raets suggested that The Iron King could be considered a grimdark historical novel. In a 2013 Booklist Starred Review, David Pitt called the novel "historical fiction on a grand scale, full of political intrigue, family drama, and characters who, while drawn from life, are larger than it". Russell Miller wrote for Library Journal:

The Sunday Times called The Iron King "dramatic and colourful as a Dumas romance but stiffened by historical accuracy and political insight" and a "blood-curdling tale of intrigue, murder, corruption and sexual passion". The Times Literary Supplement described it as "barbaric, sensual, teeming with life, based in wide reading and sound scholarship ... among the best historical novels".

Les Rois maudits was parodied on French television in the successful 1973 series  starring Roger Pierre and Jean-Marc Thibault.

References

External links
 
 

French Wikipedia
 fr:Les Rois maudits
 fr:Les Rois maudits (mini-série, 1972)
 fr:Les Rois maudits (mini-série, 2005)

Book series introduced in 1955
French historical novels
Historical novels by series
Novels set in the 14th century
Novels set in France
Novels set in the Middle Ages
Historical television series
20th-century French novels
Edward III of England